The Cameroon climbing mouse (Dendromus oreas) is a species of rodent in the family Nesomyidae which is endemic to the montane grasslands on three mountains in Cameroon.

Description
The Cameroon climbing mouse is a rather small species of mouse with a long tail and an indistinct black stripe along its back and a long tail. The fur on the dorsum is brown while the ventral fur varies from dark rufous to pale greyish-yellow. There are white or cream patches on the throat and on the chin, and on the anal fur. The ears are blackish with a fine covering of tawny hairs and with a pale spot at the base of each ear on the outer margin. The hindfoot has 5 digits with didit 5 having a claw and being opposable to the other digits.

Distribution

It is found only in Cameroon where it is known from three mountains: Mount Cameroon from 1,700 to 4,000 m above sea level, Mount Manenguba between 1,800 and 1,900 m in altitude and Mount Kupe where it occurs around 850m.

Habitat
Montane savannas above the tree line, among boulders on Mount Cameroon, in grassy scrub on Mount Manenguba and occurring in plantation and farmland on Mount Kupe. It avoids the montane forests at lower altitudes.

Habits
The Cameroon climbing mouse is both diurnal and nocturnal and lives mostly on the ground, digging burrows into the soil despite being well adapted for climbing.

Threats

The Cameroon climbing mouse is threatened by climate change which may lead to scrub and tree growth higher up the mountains in its restricted range and as the lower forests are cleared grazing livestock may move up to higher latitudes.

References

 Musser, G. G. and M. D. Carleton. 2005. Superfamily Muroidea. pp. 894–1531 in Mammal Species of the World a Taxonomic and Geographic Reference. D. E. Wilson and D. M. Reeder eds. Johns Hopkins University Press, Baltimore.
 Schlitter, D. & Dieterlen, F. 2004.  Dendromus oreas.   2006 IUCN Red List of Threatened Species.   Downloaded on 9 July 2007.

Dendromus
Endemic fauna of Cameroon
Mammals of Cameroon
Rodents of Africa
Mammals described in 1936
Vulnerable animals
Vulnerable biota of Africa
Taxonomy articles created by Polbot